The 1977 Stockholm Open was a men's tennis tournament played on indoor hard courts and part of the 1977 Colgate-Palmolive Grand Prix and took place at the Kungliga tennishallen in Stockholm, Sweden. It was the ninth edition of the tournament and was held from 6 November through 12 November 1977. Sandy Mayer won the singles title.

Finals

Singles

 Sandy Mayer defeated  Raymond Moore, 6–2, 6–4
 It was Mayer's 3rd singles title of the year and the 7th of his career.

Doubles

 Wojciech Fibak /  Tom Okker defeated  Brian Gottfried /  Raúl Ramírez, 6–3, 6–3

References

External links
  
  
 Association of Tennis Professionals (ATP) tournament profile

Stockholm Open
Stockholm Open
Stock
November 1977 sports events in Europe
1970s in Stockholm